Split and merge segmentation is an image processing technique used to segment an image.  The image is successively split into quadrants based on a homogeneity criterion and similar regions are merged to create the segmented result.  The technique incorporates a quadtree data structure, meaning that there is a parent-child node relationship.  The total region is a parent, and each of the four splits is a child.

Algorithm 
 Define the criterion to be used for homogeneity
 Split the image into equal size regions
 Calculate homogeneity for each region
 If the region is homogeneous, then merge it with neighbors
 The process is repeated until all regions pass the homogeneity test

Homogeneity 
After each split, a test is necessary to determine whether each new region needs further splitting.  The criterion for the test is the homogeneity of the region.   There are several ways to define homogeneity, some examples are:
 Uniformity- the region is homogeneous if its gray scale levels are constant or within a given threshold.
 Local mean vs global mean - if the mean of a region is greater than the mean of the global image, then the region is homogeneous
 Variance - the gray level variance is defined as

where r and c are row and column, N is the number of pixels in the region and  

An example incorporation would be that the variance of a region be less than a specified value in order to be considered homogeneous.

Data structure 
The splitting results in a partitioned image as shown below to 3 levels.

Each level of partitioning can be represented in a tree-like structure.

Example 
The following example shows the segmentation of a gray scale image using matlab.  The homogeneity criterion is thresholding, max(region)-min(region) < 10 for a region to be homogeneous.

The blocks created during splitting are shown in the following picture:

And the segmented image is below.

References

Image segmentation